Grumblethorpe, in Germantown, Philadelphia, Pennsylvania, was the home of the Wister family, who lived there for over 160 years. It was built in 1744 as a summer residence, but it became the family's year-round residence in 1793. It is a museum, part of the Colonial Germantown Historic District.

Early history 

Grumblethorpe was built as a summer residence in 1744 by Philadelphia merchant and wine importer John Wister, when Germantown was a semi-rural area outside the city of Philadelphia. It eventually became the family's year-round residence when they withdrew from the city during the Yellow Fever Epidemic of 1793.

It has a stone and oak facade and was known as "John Wister's Big House". It has lower-ceilinged rooms than those at Cliveden, Loudoun, and Stenton, other historic houses in the area. The stones for the house were quarried on the property and the joists were hewn from oaks in Wister Woods, also owned by the family. The original section of the Grumblethorpe Tenant House was built as a dependency.

The Wister family lived in the house for over 160 years. Diarist Sally Wister lived there from 1789 until her death in 1804.

Because it was built on the fertile soil of Schuylkill Valley, Grumblethorpe's garden was among the most productive in the region. It was primarily a working farm, and it dominated Philadelphia's horticultural trends for nearly two centuries (1740-1910). The land was a prime source of marketable crops and animal husbandry from the 1740s to the 1870s, and it decreased in practical use only when the farmstead grew smaller in the late 19th century.

During the American Revolutionary War 
In September 1777, the house was the scene of events in the Battle of Germantown. While the Wisters were staying in another home, British General James Agnew occupied the house as his headquarters during the battle. He was wounded and died in the front parlor, where his blood stains can still be seen on the floor.

Later history 
In the 1960s, the house was restored and refurnished to match the original period (removing an early 19th-century Georgian-style facade) and now serves as a museum. The gardens are also being restored.

Grumblethorpe was listed on the National Register of Historic Places in 1972. It is a contributing property of the Colonial Germantown Historic District, which has been designated a National Historic Landmark.

See also

National Register of Historic Places listings in Northwest Philadelphia

References

Further reading
Minardi, Joseph M. Historic Architecture in Northwest Philadelphia: 1690-1930s. Atglen, PA: Schiffer Publishing, 2011.
H.D. Eberlein and H.M. Lippincott, The Colonial Homes of Philadelphia and Its Neighbourhood, J.B. Lippincott Co., Phila. and London, 1912.
Roger W. Moss, Historic Houses of Philadelphia: A Tour of the Region's Museum Homes, University of Pennsylvania Press, 1998.
John L. Cotter, Daniel G. Roberts, and Michael Parrington, The Buried Past: An Archaeological History of Philadelphia, University of Pennsylvania Press, 1992.

External links

Official Grumblethorpe page at Philadelphia Society for the Preservation of Landmarks website

Listing at Philadelphia Architects and Buildings
Painting of Grumblethorpe

American Revolutionary War museums in Pennsylvania
Historic American Buildings Survey in Philadelphia
Historic district contributing properties in Pennsylvania
Historic house museums in Philadelphia
Houses completed in 1744
Houses on the National Register of Historic Places in Philadelphia
Georgian architecture in Pennsylvania
Germantown, Philadelphia
Wister, Philadelphia
1744 establishments in the Thirteen Colonies
Wister family
Historic House Museums of the Pennsylvania Germans